Erin Shields is a Canadian stage actress and playwright. She is best known for her play If We Were Birds, which won the Governor General's Award for English-language drama at the 2011 Governor General's Awards, and was a nominee for the 2010 Dora Mavor Moore Award for Outstanding New Play. The play premiered at the Summerworks Festival in 2008 before being mounted by Tarragon Theatre in 2010.

Her other plays include Barrel Crank, Montparnasse (cowritten with Maev Beaty), The Unfortunate Misadventures of Masha Galinski, The Epic of Gilgamesh (up to the part when Enkidu dies) and Soliciting Temptation, and Beautiful Man.

Her play Paradise Lost, a theatrical adaptation of John Milton's Paradise Lost, was a shortlisted finalist for the Governor General's Award for English-language drama at the 2018 Governor General's Awards.

In 2021, she wrote "Here We Are," a 90-minute audio poem piece to mark the one-year anniversary of the COVID-19 pandemic lockdown.

References

Canadian women dramatists and playwrights
Canadian stage actresses
Living people
21st-century Canadian actresses
21st-century Canadian dramatists and playwrights
Writers from Toronto
Actresses from Toronto
Governor General's Award-winning dramatists
21st-century Canadian women writers
Year of birth missing (living people)